Residual-resistivity ratio (also known as Residual-resistance ratio or just RRR) is usually defined as the ratio of the resistivity of a material at room temperature and at 0 K.  Of course, 0 K can never be reached in practice so some estimation is usually made.  Since the RRR can vary quite strongly for a single material depending on the amount of impurities and other crystallographic defects, it serves as a rough index of the purity and overall quality of a sample.  Since resistivity usually increases as defect prevalence increases, a large RRR is associated with a pure sample.  RRR is also important for characterizing certain unusual low temperature states such as the Kondo effect and superconductivity.  Note that since it is a unitless ratio there is no difference between a residual resistivity and residual-resistance ratio.

Background
Usually at "warm" temperatures the resistivity of a metal varies linearly with temperature.  That is, a plot of the resistivity as a function of temperature is a straight line.  If this straight line were extrapolated all the way down to absolute zero, a theoretical RRR could be calculated

In the simplest case of a good metal that is free of scattering mechanisms one would expect ρ(0K) = 0, which would cause RRR to diverge.  However, usually this is not the case because defects such as grain boundaries, impurities, etc. act as scattering sources that contribute a temperature independent ρ0 value.  This shifts the intercept of the curve to a higher number, giving a smaller RRR.  

In practice the resistivity of a given sample is measured down to as cold as possible, which on typical laboratory instruments is in the range of 2 K, though much lower is possible.  By this point the linear resistive behavior is usually no longer applicable and by the low temperature ρ is taken as a good approximation to 0 K.

Special Cases
In the Kondo effect the resistivity begins to increase again with cooling at very low temperatures, and the value of RRR is useful for characterizing this state.

Examples
 The RRR of copper wire is generally ~ 40–50 when used for telephone lines, etc.

References

Bibliography
Ashcroft, Neil W.; Mermin, N. David (1976). Solid State Physics. Holt, Rinehart and Winston. .

Electrical resistance and conductance
Cryogenics
Superconductivity